Sonnhilde Hausschild-Kallus (1 September 1935 – 20 June 2007) was a German cross-country skier. She competed at the 1956 Winter Olympics and the 1960 Winter Olympics.

Cross-country skiing results

Olympic Games

World Championships

References

External links
 

1935 births
2007 deaths
German female cross-country skiers
Olympic cross-country skiers of the United Team of Germany
Cross-country skiers at the 1956 Winter Olympics
Cross-country skiers at the 1960 Winter Olympics
Sportspeople from Rhineland-Palatinate